Francis Nigel Lee (5 December 1934 – 23 December 2011) was a British-born Christian theologian and minister. Lee was particularly known for the large number of academic degrees he earned from a variety of institutions. He obtained BA, LLB and MA degrees from the University of Cape Town; L.Th, BD, M.Th and Th.D. degrees from the University of Stellenbosch; a Ph.D. from the University of the Free State; and several other doctorates from unaccredited institutions, including D.Min, STD and D.Hum degrees from Whitefield Theological Seminary.

Lee was born in Kendal in the UK, but emigrated as a child to South Africa, where he became a minister. Lee moved to the USA, where he served as a minister in the Presbyterian Church in America, as Professor of Philosophy at Shelton College, New Jersey and as Academic Dean of Graham Bible College in Bristol, Tennessee. Lee then moved to Australia, where he served as Professor at the Presbyterian Church of Queensland Theological Hall.

Stuart Piggin notes that Lee "exuberantly led the resurgence of Reformed theology among Queensland Presbyterians."

Lee was a firm advocate of the historicist method of interpretation in Christian eschatology.

Published works

References

Further reading

External links
Autobiography Dr Francis Nigel Lee.

1934 births
2011 deaths
People from Kendal
Presidents of Calvinist and Reformed seminaries
University of Cape Town alumni
Stellenbosch University alumni
University of the Free State alumni
American Calvinist and Reformed theologians
20th-century Calvinist and Reformed theologians
Australian Presbyterian ministers
English expatriates in Australia
British emigrants to South Africa